Robert Barr (16 September 1849 – 21 October 1912) was a Scottish-Canadian short story writer and novelist who also worked as a newspaper and magazine editor.

Early years in Canada 

Barr was born in Glasgow, Scotland to Robert Barr and Jane Watson. In 1854, he emigrated with his parents to Upper Canada. His family settled on a farm near the village of Muirkirk. Barr assisted his father with his work as a carpenter and builder and was a teacher in Kent County, then in 1873 entered the Toronto Normal School.

After graduating, he taught in Walkerville and in 1874 became headmaster of the Central School at Windsor in 1874. During the 1870s, he wrote humorous pieces for various publications, including the Toronto Grip, under the pseudonym "Luke Sharp", which he took from an undertaker's sign. After the Detroit Free Press serialized his account of a boating trip on Lake Erie, in 1876 he changed careers and became a reporter there, then a columnist. Two of his brothers followed him to the newspaper.

London years 

In 1881, by which time he was exchange editor of the Free Press, Barr decided to "vamoose the ranch" and relocated to London to continue his fiction writing career while establishing a weekly English edition of the newspaper. The magazine was very successful. In 1892 he founded the magazine The Idler, choosing Jerome K. Jerome as his collaborator (wanting, as Jerome said, "a popular name"). This was also very successful. Barr stepped down as co-editor in 1894, but in 1902 became the sole proprietor and returned as editor.

In London in the 1890s, Barr began writing crime novels and became more prolific, publishing a book a year. He also wrote stories of the supernatural. Detective stories were much in vogue because of the popularity of Conan Doyle's Sherlock Holmes stories; Barr published the first Sherlock Holmes parody, "Detective Stories Gone Wrong: The Adventures of Sherlaw Kombs" (also known as "The Great Pegram Mystery") in The Idler in 1892, and followed it in 1894 with "The Adventure of the Second Swag". His 1906 novel The triumphs of Eugène Valmont parodies Holmes and other "gentleman detectives" whose pompous sleuth is a possible antecedent of Agatha Christie's Hercule Poirot. 

Barr socialized widely with other best-selling authors. In 1903, despite initial reservations about taking on the project, he completed The O'Ruddy, a novel left unfinished by his recently deceased friend Stephen Crane. Despite his Holmes satires, he remained on very good terms with Doyle, who described him in the 1920s in his memoir Memories and Adventures as "a volcanic Anglo—or rather Scot-American, with a violent manner, a wealth of strong adjectives, and one of the kindest natures underneath it all". Barr himself wrote several humorous articles about being a writer, including in 1899 “Literature in Canada” , where he described it as a country whose “average citizen ... loves whiskey better than books".

Writing style 
Barr's short stories usually feature a witty narrator and an ironic twist. His novels tend to be episodic, the chapters often linked only by the central character. His work featured a wide range of protagonists, but his characters are often stereotyped. His narration often includes moral and other asides.

Personal life and death 
In August 1876, when he was 27, Barr married Ontario-born Eva Bennett, who was 21. They had either two or three children.

The 1911 census places Robert Barr, "a writer of fiction", at Hillhead, Woldingham, Surrey, a village southeast of London, living with his wife, Eva, their son William, and two female servants. He died there from heart disease on 21 October 1912.

Honors
In 1900, Barr was awarded an honorary degree by the University of Michigan.

Works 

 In a Steamer Chair and Other Stories (13 short stories, 1892): Gutenberg Library,  Librivox
 "The Face And The Mask" (24 short stories, 1894):  Gutenberg Library
 In the Midst of Alarms (a story of the 1866 attempted Fenian invasion of Canada, 1893), Gutenberg Library
 From Whose Bourne (novel, 1896) Gutenberg Library, Internet Archive
 One Day's Courtship (1896) Gutenberg Library
 Revenge! (20 short stories, 1896) Gutenberg Library, Librivox
The Strong Arm Gutenberg Library
 A Woman Intervenes (novel, 1896) Gutenberg Library
 The Mutable Many (1896)
 Tekla: A Romance of Love and War (1898) Gutenberg Library
 Jennie Baxter, Journalist (1899) Gutenberg Library
 The Unchanging East (1900)
 The Victors (1901)
 A Prince of Good Fellows (1902) Gutenberg Library
 Over The Border: A Romance (1903)
 The O'Ruddy, A Romance, with Stephen Crane (1903) Gutenberg Library
 A Chicago Princess (1904)
 The Speculations of John Steele (1905) 
 The Tempestuous Petticoat (1905–12)
 A Rock in the Baltic (1906) Gutenberg Library
 The Triumphs of Eugène Valmont (1906) Gutenberg Library
 The Measure of the Rule (1907)
 Young Lord Stranleigh (1908)
 Stranleigh's Millions (1909)
 The Sword Maker (historical novel, 1910) Gutenberg Library, Internet Archive
 The Palace of Logs (1912)
 "The Ambassador's Pigeons" (1899)
 "And the Rigor of the Game" (1892)
 "Converted" (1896)
 "Count Conrad's Courtship" (1896) 
 "The Count's Apology" (1896)
 "A Deal on Change" (1896)
 "The Exposure of Lord Stanford" (1896)
 "Gentlemen: The King!"
 "The Hour-Glass" (1899)
 "An invitation" (1892)
 "A Ladies Man"
 "The Long Ladder" (1899)
 "Mrs. Tremain" (1892)
" Transformation" (1896)
 "The Understudy" (1896)
 " The Vengeance of the Dead" (1896)
 "The Bromley Gibbert's Story" (1896)
 " Out of Thun" (1896)
 "The Shadow of Greenback" (1896)
 "Flight of the Red Dog" (fiction)
 "Lord Stranleigh Abroad" (1913)
 "One Day's Courtship and the Heralds of Fame" (1896)
 Cardillac

Sources

References

External links

Works by or about Robert Barr at HathiTrust

Electronic editions

Works by or about Robert Barr at The Literature Network
Sony Reader e-book version of The Triumph of Eugene Valmont

1850 births
1912 deaths
19th-century Canadian novelists
19th-century Canadian short story writers
19th-century British male writers
19th-century British writers
19th-century Scottish novelists
20th-century Canadian male writers
20th-century Canadian novelists
20th-century Canadian short story writers
20th-century Scottish novelists
Canadian male novelists
Canadian male short story writers
Canadian science fiction writers
Detroit Free Press people
Scottish male novelists
Scottish science fiction writers
Scottish short story writers
Scottish emigrants to Canada
Writers from Glasgow